Daniel Gbaguidi (born 14 January 1988) is a Beninese professional footballer who plays as a striker for Régional 1 club Mâcon.

Club career 
Gbaguidi began his career 2001 with Vichy and joined Montferrand in 2002. He played only one season with the club before moving to Clermont in 2003. In May 2005 he left Clermont and signed with Marseille. On 1 July 2008, he left Marseille and joined to Championnat National club Cassis Carnoux. After only six months with Cassis Carnoux he signed with Saint-Priest in January 2009.

Since then, Gbaguidi has played for many different clubs: Mulhouse, Villefranche, FC Bleid, Virton, Iraklis Psachna, Istres, both Villefranche and Saint-Priest again, Vaulx-en-Velin, and Mâcon.

International career 
He played his debut game for Benin on 1 June 2008 against Angola. Gbaguidi is also former youth player from France he presented from 2003 to 2008 the U-15, U-16, U-17 and U-21.

References

External links 
 
 
 Profile on foot-national.com
 

Living people
1988 births
People from Cotonou
Beninese footballers
Association football forwards
Benin international footballers
French footballers
French sportspeople of Beninese descent
Championnat National players
Championnat National 2 players
Championnat National 3 players
Régional 1 players
Super League Greece 2 players
RC Vichy players
AS Montferrand Football players
Clermont Foot players
Olympique de Marseille players
SO Cassis Carnoux players
AS Saint-Priest players
FC Mulhouse players
FC Villefranche Beaujolais players
BX Brussels players
R.E. Virton players
Iraklis Psachna F.C. players
FC Istres players
FC Vaulx-en-Velin players
UF Mâconnais players
Beninese expatriate footballers
Beninese expatriate sportspeople in Belgium
Beninese expatriate sportspeople in Greece
Expatriate footballers in Belgium
Expatriate footballers in Greece
Black French sportspeople